Ed Olle (February 12, 1904 – April 3, 1964) was a college baseball and college basketball player, a men's college basketball head coach, and an athletics director at The University of Texas at Austin.

Olle played for Texas Longhorns men's basketball head coach E. J. "Doc" Stewart and for Texas baseball head coach William J. "Billy" Disch. He received all-Southwest Conference honors in baseball in 1926 and 1927. Olle would go on to coach the Longhorns in basketball for three seasons (1931–34) following the departure of "Mysterious" Fred Walker in 1931. His 1932–33 team finished the season as Southwest Conference champions with a 22–1 overall record and would many decades later receive retroactive recognition as that season's national champion in the Premo-Porretta Power Poll (the team playing as it did in an era preceding the existence of national basketball tournaments or polling). After three seasons as head coach, Olle resigned and moved into a position in the UT Athletics Department, first under Texas football head coach and Athletics Director Jack Chevigny, and later under football coach and Athletics Director Dana X. Bible. He was subsequently hired as UT Athletics Director in 1956 and remained in that position until 1962.

Head coaching record

References

American men's basketball coaches
Texas Longhorns athletic directors
Texas Longhorns baseball players
Texas Longhorns men's basketball coaches
Texas Longhorns men's basketball players
1904 births
1964 deaths
Place of birth missing
Place of death missing
American men's basketball players